Wesley Patten is an Indigenous Australian actor. He was nominated for the 2020 AACTA Award for Best Actor in a Supporting Role for his role in H is for Happiness.

Filmography
TV
Total Control (2019–21) TV series - Eddie Irving (11 episodes)
Black Comedy (2020) TV series - Guest Cast (1 episode)
Film
H is for Happiness (2019) - Douglas Benson from Another Dimension
Mrs McCutcheon short (2017) - Trevor

References

External links
 

Living people
Indigenous Australian male actors
Australian male film actors
Australian male television actors
Australian male stage actors
Year of birth missing (living people)